Derav is a village in Shahrud Rural District of Shahrud District, Khalkhal County, Ardabil province, Iran. At the 2006 census, its population was 567 in 202 households. The following census in 2011 counted 475 people in 194 households. The latest census in 2016 showed a population of 439 people in 178 households; it was the largest village in its rural district.

References 

Khalkhal County

Towns and villages in Khalkhal County

Populated places in Ardabil Province

Populated places in Khalkhal County